Meta-DOT, or 5-methylthio-2,4-dimethoxyamphetamine, is a lesser-known psychedelic drug.  It is similar in structure to TMA-2. Meta-DOT was first synthesized by Alexander Shulgin. In his book PiHKAL (Phenethylamines i Have Known And Loved), the minimum dosage is listed as 35 mg, and the duration unknown. Meta-DOT produces few to no effects. Very little data exists about the pharmacological properties, metabolism, and toxicity of Meta-DOT.

See also 
 Ortho-DOT
 Meta-DOB
 Phenethylamine
 Psychedelics, dissociatives and deliriants

References 

Substituted amphetamines
Thioethers